Two regiments of the British Army have been numbered the 113th Regiment of Foot:

113th Regiment of Foot (Royal Highlanders), raised in 1761
113th Regiment of Foot (1794), raised in 1794